is a Japanese politician from the Constitutional Democratic Party and a member of the House of Councillors in the Diet (national legislature).

Overview 

A native of Kabato District, Hokkaidō and graduate of Hokkaido University, he was elected to the House of Representatives for the first time in 1990 as an independent. He later joined first the Japan Socialist Party and then the DPJ. In 2003 he left the Diet to run for governorship of Hokkaido, which was unsuccessful. In the same year he ran for the Hokkaido 4th district in the House of Representatives and was elected.  In September 2011 he was appointed as Minister of Economy, Trade and Industry in the cabinet of newly appointed prime minister Yoshihiko Noda.

He resigned after being criticised for making controversial comments during his visit to the exclusion zone of Fukushima Daiichi nuclear disaster on September 9. He compared the vicinity of the plant to a ghost town, and on the previous day, jokingly mimicked rubbing his jacket on a journalist while telling him "I'll give you radiation."

Hachiro lost re-election in the 2012 general election. He recontested his old seat in 2014, but narrowly lost to the incumbent MP. He ran for a Hokkaido seat in the 2016 House of Councillors election, successfully obtaining the third seat allocated for the prefecture. When the Democratic Party merged with the Party of Hope in May 2018 to form the Democratic Party for the People, Hachiro did not join the new party and moved the CDP instead.

References

External links 
 Official website in Japanese.

Members of the House of Representatives (Japan)
People from Hokkaido
Living people
1948 births
Constitutional Democratic Party of Japan politicians
Social Democratic Party (Japan) politicians
Democratic Party of Japan politicians
Hokkaido University alumni
21st-century Japanese politicians
Government ministers of Japan